This article provides details of international football games played by the Israel national football team from 1960 to 1989.

Results

1960

1961

1962

1963

1964

1966

1967

1968

1969

1970

1971

1972

1973

1974

1975

1976

1977

1978

1979

1980

1981

1983

1984

1985

1986

1987

1988

1989

See also
Israel national football team results (2020–present)
Israel national football team results (1990–2019)
Israel national football team results (1934–1959)

References

External links

Football in Israel
1960s in Israeli sport
1970s in Israeli sport
1980s in Israeli sport